"Allison Road" is a song by the American alternative rock band Gin Blossoms.

Background
In 1989, Robin Wilson passed by a sign on his way to El Paso that read "Next Exit Allison Road."  The friend with whom he was riding had a sister named Allison, and so they stopped to take a picture.  Five months later, Wilson had the picture and was bored.  In a Billboard interview from 1994, he recalled:
I walked to the other room, sat down in front of the television and turned on CNN. And the moment the TV turned on I heard that little melody in my head; 'On Allison Road.' And I was like, 'Shit!' So I turned off the TV, climbed over the couch and went back in my bedroom and the song was pretty much done 20 minutes later.

The exit sign for Allison Road is located on Interstate 10 in Roosevelt, Texas.

At this point in the band's history, Wilson had struggled in convincing his bandmates to record the songs he had written: in particular, guitarist Doug Hopkins would often refuse to rehearse Wilson's tracks or help him finish songs. However, "Allison Road" had impressed his bandmates sufficiently to earn a place on the band's album. Wilson recalled, "When I came in with 'Allison Road,' it was hard for everybody, even Doug, to deny that I had a significant contribution to make to the songs."

Release
"Allison Road" was a moderate hit when released as the fourth single from New Miserable Experience, charting on the Airplay charts in the US as well as reaching number 21 in Canada.

Critical reception
"Allison Road" saw praise from music critics. Ed Masley of The Arizona Republic listed the song as the Gin Blossom's ninth best song on his list of the band's top 30 tracks, dubbing the song a "jangle-rocking gem."

Charts

Footnotes

External links
https://www.youtube.com/watch?v=KyfNk3FTHGU
https://www.imdb.com/title/tt1972779/soundtrack

Gin Blossoms songs
1994 singles
Songs written by Robin Wilson (musician)
1992 songs
A&M Records singles
Fontana Records singles